Lundu is a district, in Kuching Division, Sarawak, Malaysia.

References